Clapton Crabb Rolfe (5 March 1845 – 18 December 1907) was an English Gothic Revival architect whose practice was based in Oxford.

Family
Rolfe was the second of nine children. His father was Rev. George Crabb Rolfe (1811–93) who was perpetual curate of Hailey, Oxfordshire from 1838 until his death. His mother Ellen was a sister of the architect William Wilkinson. Rolfe's elder brother George Wilkinson Rolfe (1843–1912) followed their father into the clergy and a younger brother, William Andrew Rolfe (born 1850), also became an architect. In 1873 Rolfe married Annie de Pré. They had one son, Benedict Hugh Rolfe (born 1874) who trained as an architect and assisted his father on some of his later works, before settling in London as a consulting engineer.

Rolfe died in 1907. Both he and Annie are buried in the parish churchyard of St Mary's, Wheatley, Oxfordshire.

The Buildings of England series of architectural guides spells Rolfe's middle name "Crabbe" but other authorities use "Crabb", A memorial plaque in Hailey parish church to his father Rev. G.C. Rolfe also uses the latter spelling.

Career

Much of Rolfe's work was for parish churches and other institutions of the Church of England. His first major commission was to design a new parish church at Hailey for his father. His design was in a freely reinterpreted French Gothic style. The Oxford Diocesan Architect G.E. Street condemned Rolfe's first draft as "needlessly eccentric". Despite Street's objections Rolfe completed the church with some unusual details, including an unusually shaped bell-turret.

Rolfe's work is notable for its quality and detail. In his reconstruction of part of the nave of Nuneaton Abbey and his restoration of All Saints parish church, Thorpe Malsor, the carving was undertaken by Harry Hems (1842–1916), a craftsman who originated from Yorkshire but from 1866 worked in Exeter. He carved for Rolfe again on the restorations of St Giles' parish church, Standlake in 1880–91, St Martin's parish church, Chipping Ongar in 1884, and St Michael's parish church, Inkpen in 1896–97, and also at Rolfe's new chapel for the Sisterhood of Saint Thomas, Oxford in 1888.

Rolfe became an Associate of the Royal Institute of British Architects in 1869. In 1881, following the death of G.E. Street, Rolfe was one of the applicants to succeed him as Oxford diocesan architect. John Oldrid Scott was the successful applicant, but Rolfe was later appointed Oxford Diocesan Surveyor.

Rolfe was a devout Anglo-Catholic who sought to translate his faith into his building work. In 1871 he wrote in The Builder:
Those professional men nowadays who despise and ridicule that pure symbolic spirit which actuated our forefathers in their church-work, and probably substitute for it that £sd money-grubbing spirit of the age, are alike unfit and unworthy of being engaged on any modern church-work whatever.
Rolfe wrote a number of publications on aspects of church architecture and furnishing, but as he got older the style and content of his writing became increasingly obscure.

Works

Buildings
Saint John the Evangelist, Hailey, Oxfordshire: new church, 1868–69
Old Church, Churchill, Oxfordshire: east window, 1869
114–138, 149–156 and 159–164 Kingston Road, Oxford: terraces of artisan houses, 1870–75
Ascott-under-Wychwood: village school, 1871
Leafield, Oxfordshire: extension to village school, 1871
All Saints, Nuneham Courtenay: new church, 1872–74
Holy Trinity, Rayleigh, Essex: restoration of chancel, 1873
Saint John the Baptist, Curbridge, Oxfordshire: added apse to chapel, 1874 (demolished 1906)
Saint James's College, South Leigh: 1875 (later part of Holyrood Hospital)
Saint Peter, Mancetter, Warwickshire: restoration, 1875
Nuneaton Abbey, Warwickshire: new vicarage and reconstruction of part of nave, 1877
All Saints, Thorpe Malsor, Northamptonshire: restoration, 1877
Saint Margaret, Eglwyscummin, Carmarthenshire: restoration, 1878
King Edward VI Grammar School, Nuneaton, Warwickshire: new buildings, 1879–80
Saint Giles, Standlake, Oxfordshire: restored church, 1880–91
Saint Lawrence, Appleton, Berkshire (now in Oxfordshire): restored nave, 1882–84
Saint Martin, Chipping Ongar, Essex: south aisle, 1884
Holy Rood, Shilton, Oxfordshire: restored church, 1884–88
Sisterhood of Saint Thomas, Oxford: new buildings, 1886 (demolished 1969)
29 Abbey Road, Oxford: house, 1886–87
Saint Denis, Northmoor, Oxfordshire: partial restoration, 1886 or 1887
Holywell Ford, Mill Lane, Oxford: house, 1888
Saint Thomas, Oxford: vicarage, 1893
Barnett House, Turl Street, Oxford: house on corner of Broad Street, 1889 (demolished 1960's)
Hailey parish school, Oxfordshire: infants' classroom, 1892
Holy Rood, Cuxham, Oxfordshire: rebuilt chancel, 1895
Saint Michael, Inkpen, Berkshire: restored and remodelled church, 1896
Saint Nicholas, Dormston, Worcestershire: restoration, 1899

Written works

References

Sources

1845 births
1907 deaths
Architects from Oxford
English ecclesiastical architects
Gothic Revival architects
English Anglo-Catholics
People from South Oxfordshire District